The prolactin-releasing peptide receptor (PrRPR) also known as G-protein coupled receptor 10 (GPR10) is a protein that in humans is encoded by the PRLHR gene.

PrRPR is a G-protein coupled receptor that binds the prolactin-releasing peptide (PRLH).

Function 

PrRPR is a 7-transmembrane domain receptor for prolactin-releasing peptide that is highly expressed in the anterior pituitary.

References

Further reading

External links

 

G protein-coupled receptors